The Wola Obszańska gas field in Poland was discovered in 1989. It began production in 1992 and produces natural gas. The total proven reserves of the Wola Obszańska gas field are around 37 billion cubic feet (1×109m³).

References

Natural gas fields in Poland